UEFA Euro 2016 was a football tournament that took place in June and July 2016 involving 24 men's national teams from nations affiliated to the Union of European Football Associations (UEFA). The tournament was broadcast via television and radio all over the world, with the rights divided between various nations and wider territories (e.g. Sub-Saharan Africa and the Caribbean nations).

In addition, IMG secured the in-flight and on-ship broadcasting rights.

Television

UEFA

Rest of the world

Radio

See also
UEFA Euro 2016 qualifying broadcasting rights

References

Broadcasting Rights
2016